Nirmali Assembly constituency is an assembly constituency in Supaul district in the Indian state of Bihar.

Overview
As per Delimitation of Parliamentary and Assembly constituencies Order, 2008, No. 41  Nirmali Assembly constituency is composed of the following: Nirmali, Raghopur and Saraigarh Bhaptiyahi community development blocks.

Nirmali Assembly constituency is part of No. 8 Supaul (Lok Sabha constituency).

Members of Legislative Assembly

Election results

2020

References

External links
 

Assembly constituencies of Bihar
Politics of Supaul district